The 1999 Brownlow Medal was the 72nd year the award was presented to the player adjudged the fairest and best player during the Australian Football League (AFL) home-and-away season. Shane Crawford of the Hawthorn Football Club won the medal by polling twenty-eight votes during the 1999 AFL season.

The count was notable in that it was the first time since the award's inception in 1924 that it was held outside Melbourne.

Leading vote-getters

References 

Brownlow Medal
1999
Brownlow Medal